Akademik Ioffe is a research vessel, named after the Soviet physicist Abram Fedorovich Ioffe.

Akademik Ioffe  and Akademik Sergey Vavilov were built as a joint project. Both ships feature a vertical shaft about two meters in diameter, which opens from the main deck into a special room, from which an acoustic receiver or a transmitter can be lowered to below the waterline by means of a winch. The vessels were used for experiments on the long-range propagation of sound in the ocean.

The vessel belongs to the Institute of Oceanology. P. P. Shirshov, of the Russian Academy of Sciences.

She was chartered by One Ocean Expeditions until 2019.

2018 grounding

The vessel ran aground in the Gulf of Boothia, Nunavut, Canada in August 2018. There were 126 people on board; none were lost.  The Akademik is said to have remained aground for 12 hours. The salvage effort cost Canadian taxpayers $513,025.44, in addition to Canadian Coast Guard costs.

Research expeditions
 1st expedition - August - December 1989, together with the R/V Academik Vavilov. Six groups of researchers from the USSR Academy of Sciences. Included - attempts to measure neutrinos, to study the passage of ultra-low-frequency oscillations, etc.
 8th expedition - June - September 2000.
 10th expedition - October - November 2001. Geological studies in the equatorial part of the Atlantic Ocean.
 19th expedition - autumn 2005. Hydrological sections in the Drake Passage, Bransfield Strait and the Loper Strait.
 20th expedition - spring of 2006.
 21st expedition - summer of 2006. Hydrological section 59°30'; from the UK shelf to the southern tip of Greenland.
 22nd expedition - autumn of 2006.
 23rd expedition - summer of 2007. Hydrological section 59°30' from the UK shelf to the southern tip of Greenland, to the port of Iqaluit.
 24th expedition - the fall of 2007. Hydrological section through the Drake Passage.
 25th expedition - summer of 2008. A hydrological section of 59 ° 30 'from the UK shelf to the southern tip of Greenland - the Farwell metro station, ending in the port of St. John's (Newfoundland)
 29th expedition is from October to November 2009.

References 

 Советов Ю. Геологический форум под Южным Крестом // Наука в Сибири : Газета. — 2000. — № 48. — о 8-м рейсе судна
 Колобов В. 32 дня в Атлантике и четыре дебюта // Наука в Сибири : Газета. — 2002. — № 4-5. — о 10-м рейсе судна
 
— описание 29-го рейса судна со слов д-ра А. Переса (Бразилия)

Research vessels of Russia
Research vessels of the Soviet Union
1987 ships
Ships built in Rauma, Finland